Landbell AG für Rückhol-Systeme – or Landbell Group - is a service provider that carries out take-back and recycling obligations for companies. It supports companies in meeting their extended producer responsibility (EPR) obligations and other product and packaging related requirements. The company operates worldwide through its own network of producer responsibility organisations (PROs). Landbell Group's head office is located in Mainz.

History 
Landbell AG was founded in September 1995 as a local waste management company in Germany. Its aim was to support companies with their obligation to take back and recycle their sales packaging. It developed its own take-back scheme in a pilot project in cooperation with the Lahn-Dill district. In August 2003, Landbell was approved as a packaging compliance scheme in the federal state of Hesse. Up to this point, Duales System Deutschland GmbH (DSD) had been the only such option in Germany. In August 2006, Landbell was approved nationwide as a packaging compliance scheme. In 2009, the business started to support companies based abroad with their recycling obligations in Germany.

Expansion 
In 2014 they merged with European Recycling Platform (ERP) and founded the Landbell Group. ERP had been created in 2002 by Hewlett-Packard, Electrolux, Sony and Procter & Gamble in response to the introduction of the European Union's Waste Electrical and Electronic Equipment (WEEE) Directive, and the Batteries Directive which was adopted in 2006.  Landbell Group expanded its services to include WEEE and batteries in 15 countries. 

Since 2014, Landbell Group acquired further companies, including H2 Compliance (in 2016), and holds shares in numerous other companies, including TerraCycle GmbH in the DACH region.

Company structure and memberships 
Jan Patrick Schulz is CEO of Landbell Group since 1 July 2007. Tim Scholz is CFO since 2019. Frank Binder is the main shareholder since the company‘s foundation. The company has been family-owned for over 20 years. Today, the group of companies is represented in 24 locations in 19 countries worldwide and employs around 320 employees from 32 nations. In 2019, the company operated 32 approved take-back schemes for packaging, WEEE or batteries in 14 countries.

In 2019, Landbell Group joined the waste and recycling alliance, Prevent. The alliance was established by the German Federal Ministry for Economic Cooperation and Development to promote the expansion of a functioning waste and recycling management system in emerging and developing countries.

As an international company, Landbell Group offers solutions for producers and retailers to help them comply with their obligations under global environmental and chemical legislation. This is done through the operation of take-back schemes for packaging, WEEE and batteries, as well as worldwide consulting and compliance services relating to EPR and chemicals legislation.

References

External links 

Holding companies of Germany
Companies established in 1995
Companies based in Mainz
German brands
Multinational companies headquartered in Germany